Ras Kebdana or Ras El Ma (Tarifit: Qabuyawa, ⵇⴰⴱⵓⵢⴰⵡⴰ; Arabic: رأس الماء) is a town in Nador Province, Oriental, Morocco. It is a seaport, is located in the province of Nador.  According to the 2014 census, it has a population of 7,580.

History 
The town was part of the Kingdom of Nekor around the 8th century AD.

Economy 
For centuries, the people of Ras Kebdana lived as self-sufficient farmers from agriculture, livestock farming and fishing, which is today the most important source of income. Tourism also plays a certain role, as the east is a 6-kilometer-long sandy beach, which is visited on the weekends by day-trippers from Nador and Oujda.

Gallery

References

External links

Mediterranean port cities and towns in Morocco
Rural communes of Oriental (Morocco)
Populated places in Nador Province